Kep or KEP may refer to:

Kep

Australia 
 Kep Track

Cambodia 
 Kep Province
 Kep District
 Krong Kep (town)
 Kep National Park

Vietnam 
 Kép, Vietnam
 Kép Railway Station
 Kep Campaign, Sino-French War (1884–1885)

Other 
 Kep Enderby (1926–2015), Australian politician

KEP
 King Edward Point, South Georgia
 Greek acronym for Movement of Free Citizens, a short-lived Greek political party
 Kinetic energy penetrator
 Korea Engineering Plastics
 Kyrgyz Express Post